Grevillea reptans, also known as the Tin Can Bay grevillea, is a species of flowering plant in the family Proteaceae and is endemic to south-eastern Queensland. It is usually a prostrate shrub with long vine-like or arching branches, more or less linear leaves, and branched clusters of mauve-pink flowers.

Description

Taxonomy
Grevillea reptans was first formally described in 2000 by Robert Owen Makinson in the Flora of Australia from specimens collected in 1966 by Clifford Gittins, near Howard, Queensland in Queensland. The specific epithet (reptans) means "creeping" or "crawling".

Distribution and habitat
Tin Can Bay grevillea grows in shrubby woodland and heathy wallum in scattered places between Burrum Heads, Tewantin and Cooloola National Park, north of Brisbane in south-eastern Queensland.

See also
 List of Grevillea species

References

reptans
Proteales of Australia
Taxa named by Robert Owen Makinson
Flora of Queensland
Plants described in 2000